"The Right Time" is a song by Australian rock group Hoodoo Gurus. It was released in October 1993 as the lead single from the group's sixth studio album, Crank. The song peaked at number 41 on the ARIA charts.

In June 2000, Dave Faulkner said "... [it] was originally conceived to be just one of a suite of songs, a mini-opera like the Who's A Quick One as I strived to fulfil my Wagnerian masterplan to revive the '70s concept album (c.f. Radiohead). Two other songs from Crank, "Hypocrite Blues" and "Gospel Train", also survive from the grand opus. "The Right Time" was intended as the theme for a female gang of motorcycle hellcats, but of course that's obvious."

Track listing
 CD single (7432116898-2)
 "The Right Time" — 3:55
 "Road Hog" — 2:30
 "Wait for the Sun"  — 3:05

Personnel
 Richard Grossman — bass
 Dave Faulkner — lead vocals, guitar, keyboards
 Mark Kingsmill — drums
 Brad Shepherd — guitar, vocals
 Producer — Ed Stasium (track 1), Hoodoo Gurus (tracks 2, 3)
 Engineer — Paul Hamingson (track 1), Charles Fisher (tracks 2, 3)
 Mixer — Greg Calbi (track 1), Darius Sulic (tracks 2, 3)
 Mastering — Greg Calbi

Charts

References

1993 singles
Hoodoo Gurus songs
1993 songs
Songs written by Dave Faulkner (musician)